Mont-de-Lans is a former commune in the Isère department in southeastern France. On 1 January 2017, it was merged into the new commune Les Deux Alpes.

Population

See also
Communes of the Isère department

References

Former communes of Isère
Isère communes articles needing translation from French Wikipedia